1996 is a year.

1996 may also refer to:

 1996 (number)
 1996 (Merle Haggard album)
 1996 (Royal Hunt album)
 1996 (Ryuichi Sakamoto album)
 1996 (Eighteen Visions album)
 "1996" (song), a song by The Wombats
 "1996", a song by Ella Henderson from Chapter One
 "1996", a song by Marilyn Manson from Antichrist Superstar
 "1996", a song by Brand New from Leaked Demos 2006
 "1996", a song by Pomme from Les failles